Breakneck Creek is a tributary of Connoquenessing Creek that flows in a northwardly direction in Western Pennsylvania.  It forms in the village of Bakerstown in Allegheny County then flows northwest through the borough of Valencia in Butler County.

From there, it continues northwest through the boroughs of Mars, Callery, and Evans City.  Breakneck flows a few more miles until it reaches the village of Eidenau where it flows into Connoquenessing Creek.

History
The only known train station to span a waterway was located in Evans City.  The Evans City Station was constructed on a platform above Breakneck in downtown.  This structure was included in the Ripley's Believe It or Not! archive.  The building is no longer standing.

References

Sources 
An Historical Gazetteer of Butler County, Pennsylvania, Mechling Bookbindery., 2006, .
Cole, Wayne A., Ghost Rails VI Harmony Route, ColeBooks, 2009, .
Parisi, Larry D., Butler County, Arcadia Publishing, 2004, .

See also
List of rivers of Pennsylvania

Rivers of Pennsylvania
Tributaries of the Beaver River
Rivers of Allegheny County, Pennsylvania
Rivers of Butler County, Pennsylvania